Letowski or Łętowski (feminine: Łętowska; plural: Łętowscy) is a surname. Notable people with the surname include:

 Ewa Łętowska (born 1940), Polish lawyer
 Trevor Letowski (born 1977), Canadian ice hockey player and coach

See also
 
 

Polish-language surnames